Platybelone lovii is a species of needlefish from the family Belonidae. It is a predatory, pelagic fish which is endemic to the eastern Atlantic Ocean in the waters around Cape Verde. This species was described by Albert Günther in 1866 as Belone lovii and was named in honour of the British naturalist Richard Thomas Lowe (1802-1874).

References

lovii
Taxa named by Albert Günther
Fish described in 1866